Daonella is a genus of oyster-like saltwater clams, marine bivalve mollusks which lived in the middle to late Triassic period.  They are related to the genera Aparimella and Halobia.  Since they were ubiquitous in the Arctic, Tethys and Panthalassa seas, they are frequently used as index fossils in dating rocks to the Triassic period.  However, the systematic classification of the Daonella is still an area of ongoing research.

References

Prehistoric bivalve genera
Triassic bivalves
Triassic animals of Asia
Triassic animals of Europe
Ostreida